Italy competed at the 1977 European Athletics Indoor Championships in San Sebastián, Spain, from 12 to 13 March 1977.

Medalists

Top eight
Seven-time the Italian athletes reached the top eight in this edition of the championships.
Men

Women

See also
 Italy national athletics team

References

External links
 EAA official site 

1977
1977 European Athletics Indoor Championships
1977 in Italian sport